The 1855 Kentucky gubernatorial election was held on August 6, 1855. Know Nothing Charles S. Morehead defeated Democratic nominee Beverly L. Clarke with 51.63% of the vote.

General election

Candidates 

 Charles S. Morehead, Know Nothing
 Beverly L. Clarke, Democratic

Results

References 

1855
Kentucky